André Fliess (born January 19, 1992) is a German footballer who plays as an attacking midfielder for FC Eddersheim in the Hessenliga.

Career

Fliess began his career with Kickers Offenbach, making his 3. Liga debut in August 2011, as a substitute for Sead Mehic in a 4–1 defeat to SpVgg Unterhaching. In July 2012, he signed for Eintracht Frankfurt II.

External links

André Fliess at Fupa

1992 births
Living people
German footballers
Kickers Offenbach players
Eintracht Frankfurt II players
Rot-Weiss Frankfurt players
Footballers from Frankfurt
3. Liga players
Association football midfielders
SC Hessen Dreieich players